The Admiral-superintendent, Portsmouth was the Royal Navy officer in command of the Naval Dockyard. Portsmouth from 1832 to 1971; prior to this date a resident Commissioner of the Navy Board had had oversight of the yard, since 1649. In May 1971 command responsibility for naval staff in the dockyard was merged into the wider local command structure, initially under the dual designation of Flag Officer, Portsmouth and Admiral Superintendent, Portsmouth  but in July 1971 was again renamed Flag Officer Spithead and Port Admiral Portsmouth after a couple of months. These joint titles was used until 1975, and despite the name change the command still covered the same geographic area and operational responsibilities until 1996 when its ceased to exist as a separate command appointment and its responsibilities were assumed by the staff of Flag Officer First Flotilla.

History
From 1546 until 1832 prime responsibility for administering H.M. Royal Navy Dockyards lay with the Navy Board, and resident commissioners who were naval officers though civilian employees of the Navy Board, not sea officers   in charge of the day-to-day operational running of the dockyard and superintendence of its sea officer and ratings staff, following the abolition of that board its functions were merged within the Admiralty and a new post styled  Admiral-superintendent was established the admiral-superintendent usually held the rank of rear-admiral though sometimes commodore and  vice-admiral. His immediate subordinate was an officer known as the captain of the dockyard (or captain of the port from 1969). This followed the appointment of a (civilian) Chief Executive of the Royal Dockyards in September 1969 and the creation of a centralised Royal Dockyards Management Board that were responsible for the civilian functions and staff at dockyards. Admiral-superintendents ceased to be appointed in the royal navy after 15 September 1971, and existing post-holders were renamed port admirals. In May 1971 the post holder was given wider responsibilities and the additional title of Flag Officer, Portsmouth and along with Admiral-superintendent, Portsmouth until July 1971 when Flag Officer, Portsmouth's title was renamed Flag Officer, Spithead and Admiral-superintendent, Portsmouth  became Port Admiral Portsmouth until August 1975 when the name was changed again to Flag Officer, Portsmouth and Port Admiral Portsmouth until October 1996, when it ceased to exist as a separate formation that was then absorbed into the Flag Officer First Flotilla's responsibilities, later renamed Portsmouth Flotilla.

Office Holders
H.M Dockyard Portsmouth was originally administered by an Admiral superintendent from 1832 to 1971.
 Rear-Admiral Frederick Lewis Maitland, June 1832–July 1837 
 Rear-Admiral the Hon. Duncan Playdell Bouverie, July 1837–August 1842
 Rear-Admiral Rear-Admiral Hyde Parker C.B., August 1842–October 1847
 Rear-Admiral William Henry Shirreff, October 1847–December 1847
 Rear-Admiral Henry Prescott, December 1847–October 1852
 Rear-Admiral Arthur Fanshawe, October 1852–November 1853
 Rear-Admiral William Fanshawe Martin, November 1853–February 1858
 Rear-Admiral the Hon. George Grey, February 1858–February 1863
 Rear-Admiral George Elliot, February 1863-June 1865
 Rear-Admiral George G. Wellesley, June 1865–June 1869
 Rear-Admiral Astley Cooper Key, July 1869–June 1870
 Vice-Admiral Sir William Loring, June 1870–November 1871
 Rear-Admiral William Houston Stewart, November 1871–April 1872
 Rear-Admiral Sir Francis Leopold McClintock, April 1872–April 1877
 Vice-Admiral the Hon. Fitzgerald A.C. Foley, April 1877–April 1882
 Rear-Admiral John D. McCrea, May 1882–March 1883
 Rear-Admiral Frederick A. Herbert, April 1883–November 1886
 Rear-Admiral John Ommanney Hopkins, November 1886–August 1888
 Rear-Admiral William E. Gordon, August 1888–May 1891
 Rear-Admiral John Arbuthnot Fisher, May 1891–February 1892
 Rear-Admiral Charles George Fane, February 1892–February 1896
 Vice-Admiral Ernest Rice, February 1896–September 1899
 Rear-Admiral Pelham Aldrich, 1 September 1899 – 1 September 1902
Vice-Admiral Reginald F.H. Henderson, 1 September 1902 – February 1905
 Rear-Admiral Sir Henry D. Barry, February 1905–November 1906   
 Vice-Admiral Charles G. Robinson, November 1906–May 1909   
 Vice-Admiral F. Alban A. G. Tate, May 1909–May 1912   
 Rear-Admiral Herbert L. Heath, May 1912–August 1915   
 Rear-Admiral Arthur W. Waymouth, August 1915–January 1917   
 Rear-Admiral Charles L. Vaughan-Lee, January1917–April 1920   
 Rear-Admiral Sir Edwyn S. Alexander-Sinclair, April 1920–September 1922   
 Vice-Admiral Sir E. Percy F.G.  Grant, September 1922–January1925   
 Rear-Admiral Rear-Admiral Bertram S. Thesiger, January 1925–May 1927   
 Vice-Admiral Leonard A. B. Donaldson, May 1927–May 1931   
 Vice-Admiral Sir Henry K. Kitson, May 1931–September 1935   
 Vice-Admiral Sir Robert R. Turner, September 1935–November 1940   
 Vice-Admiral Sir Marshal L. Clarke, November 1940–November 1945   
 Vice-Admiral Sir L. Vaughan Morgan, November 1945–July 1949   
 Vice-Admiral William Y. La R. Beverley, July 1949 – October 1951   
 Rear-Admiral A. Gordon V. Hubback, October 1951 – October 1954   
 Vice-Admiral Jocelyn S.C. Salter, October 1954 – October 1957   
 Rear-Admiral John H. Unwin, October 1957 – January 1961   
 Rear-Admiral Sir John S.W. Walsham, Bt, January 1961 – January 1964
 Rear-Admiral Joseph L. Blackham, January 1964 – May 1966   
 Rear-Admiral Richard C. Paige, May 1966 – July 1968   
 Rear-Admiral Arthur M. Power, July 1968 – May 1971
 Rear-Admiral Peter G. La Niece, May 1971 – July 1971

Captain of Portsmouth dockyard, and deputy superintendent

Included:
 Captain R. Nelson Ommanney, January 1900-March 1903   
 Captain George A. Callaghan, October 1903-April 1904 
 Captain Francis R. Pelly, April 1904-December 1905 
 Captain Alban G. Tate, December 1905-July 1907 
 Captain Henry Loftus Tottenham, July 1907-March 1909, 
 Captain William B. Fawckner, March 1909-February 1912 
 Captain Cyril E. Tower, February 1912-June 1916 
 Captain Edward H. Moubray, June 1916-May 1918 
 Captain Albert C. Scott, May 1918-December 1920 
 Captain Charles Tibbits, December 1920-February 1923 
 Captain Alfred H. Norman, February 1923-March 1925 
 Captain James D. Campbell, March 1925-December 1926 
 Captain Alexander R.W. Woods, December 1926-November 1928 
 Captain Reginald St. P. Parry, November 1928-January 1931 
 Captain Albert J. Robertson, January 1931-February 1933  
 Captain Edward B. Cloete, February 1933-May 1935 
 Captain William S.F. Macleod, May 1935-December 1936 
 Captain Kenneth H.L. Mackenzie, December 1936-March 1939 
 Captain Cuthbert Coppinger, March 1939-February 1941 
 Captain Irving M. Palmer, February 1941-January 1943 
 Captain Walter C. Tancred, January 1943-March 1945 
 Captain Edward F.B. Law, March 1945-March 1947 
 Captain Cecil R.L. Parry, March 1947-November 1948 
 Captain George V.M. Dolphin, November 1948-December 1950 
 Captain Peter Skelton, December 1950-October 1953 
 Captain P. Unwin, October 1953-October 1954 
 Captain John H. Unwin, October 1954-? 1955 
 Captain Archibald G. Forman, November 1955-April 1957 
 Captain Robin H. Maurice, April 1957-May 1959 
 Captain Bertie Pengelly, May 1959-May 1961 
 Captain Francis P.Baker, May 1961-May 1963 
 Captain John A. Marrack, May 1963-December 1965 
 Captain Terence L. Martin, December 1965-November 1967 
 Captain Kenneth H. Martin, November 1967-September 1968 
 Captain Philip R.G. Smith, September 1968-July 1969 
Captain of the Port, Portsmouth
 Captain Kenneth H. Martin, July 1969-May 1971 
 Captain Henry E. Howard, May 1971-? 1973  
 Captain Stanley W. Clayden, December 1973-March 1975 
 Captain John L. Ommanney, April 1975-October 1977 
 Captain John R. Grindle, October 1977-February 1979 
 Captain Peter A. Pinkster, February 1979-May 1980 
 Captain Clifford J. Caughey, May 1980-February 1982 
 Captain Anthony R. Wavish, February 1982 – 1984 
 Captain Christopher J.T. Chamberlen, July 1984 – 1987 
 Captain Richard A. Smith, 1987-November 1989 
Post existed until 1994 though this is an incomplete list

See also
 Flag Officer, Portsmouth
 Flag Officer, Spithead
 Port Admiral Portsmouth
 Resident Commissioner, Portsmouth Dockyard

References
Citations

Sources
 Donnithorne, Christopher (2017). Naval Biographical Database. Other Data. http://www.navylist.org/otherdata.htm.
 Mackie. Colin (2017). British Armed Forces from 1860. Senior Royal Navy Appointments from 1865: Gulabin. http://www.gulabin.com/.
 The National Archives. (1567-1920). Research guides. "Royal Naval dockyard staff". the National Archives. Retrieved 21 March 2017.

External links
 Naval Dockyards Society, UK.

Po
Royal Navy
1832 establishments in the United Kingdom
1971 disestablishments in the United Kingdom